The Jewish Northern Cemetery in Nørrebro was formerly the principal Jewish cemetery in Copenhagen, Denmark. It has an area of 13,500 square metres and contains some 5,500 burials.

History
The Jewish congregation in Copenhagen purchased a 900 square metre site outside the city for use as a burial site in the early 1690s. The oldest burial in the cemetery is from 1694. Further acquisitions of land had brought the cemetery up to its current size by 1854 but it was still passed out of use when a new Jewish cemetery opened in connection with the new Vestre Cemetery.

Today
The brick wall which today surrounds the cemetery on three sides, along Møllegade, Guldbergsgade and Birkegade, was built in 1873 to a design by   Vilhelm Tvede. The entrance is on Møllegade. The cemetery was listed in 1983.

Burials

 David Baruch Adler, broker
 Hanna Adler, educator
 Joel Ballin, engraver
 Samuel Jacob Ballin, physician
 Sophus Berendsen, industrialist
 Herman Bing, book dealer
 Jacob Herman Bing, industrialist
 Meyer Herman Bing, industrialist
 Simon Aron Eibeschütz, philanthropist
 Liepmann Fraenckel, portrait painter
 David Halberstadt, merchant
 Ludvig Heckscher, lawyer
 Marie Henriques, painter
 Martin Henriques, banker
 Nathan Henriques, painter
 Sally Henriques, painter
 Samuel Henriques, painter
 Isaac W. Heyman, businessman
 Samuel Jacobi, physician
 Ahron Jacobson, engraver
 Albert Jacobson, ædelstenskærer
 David Ahron Jacobson, engraver
 Salomon Ahron Jacobson, engraver
 Isidor Kalckar, painter
 Israel Levin, linguist
 Moritz Levy, national bank manager
 Moritz G. Melchior, merchant
 Moses Melchior, merchant
 Nathan Melchior, eye surgeon
 Moses Mendel, printer
 Hartvig Philip Rée, merchant
 Salomon Soldin, book dealer
 Arnold Wallick, stage painter
 Abraham Wolff, Chief Rabbi

Cultural depictions

Music
The Jewish Northern Cemetery is the subject of an instrumental song, "The Jewish Cemetery on Møllegade", by Jóhann Jóhannsson.

Image gallery

See also
 Great Synagogue (Copenhagen)

References

External links

 Pamphlet about the cemetery

Cemeteries in Copenhagen
Jewish cemeteries
Listed buildings and structures in Nørrebro
1694 establishments in Denmark
Judaism in Copenhagen
Cemeteries established in the 17th century